Rua Alguem 5555: My Father is a 2003 Italian-Brazilian-Hungarian drama film directed by Egidio Eronico and starring Thomas Kretschmann, Charlton Heston and F. Murray Abraham.  It is based on the novel Vati by Peter Schneider.

Cast
Thomas Kretschmann as Hermann M.
Charlton Heston as The Father (Josef Mengele)
F. Murray Abraham as Paul Minsky
Thomas Heinze as Robert S.
Camilo Beviláqua as Jens Keitel
Odilon Wagner as Wolfgang Weinert
Denise Weinberg as Magdalena Weinert
Petra Maria Reinhardt as Young Hermann's Mother
Marit Nissen as Young Aunt Lotte

Production
Filming occurred in Rio de Janeiro in October 2001.

References

External links
 

2000s English-language films
English-language Hungarian films
English-language Italian films
English-language Brazilian films
2000s German-language films
2000s Hungarian-language films
2000s Portuguese-language films
Films based on German novels
Italian drama films
Brazilian drama films
Hungarian drama films
Cultural depictions of Josef Mengele
2003 multilingual films
Italian multilingual films
Brazilian multilingual films
Hungarian multilingual films